The École nationale supérieure des sciences de l'information et des bibliothèques (ENSSIB; French for National Superior School of Information Science and Libraries) is a French grande école based in Villeurbanne, near Lyon. It is administered by the Ministry of Higher Education, Research and Innovation. 

Enssib's predecessor, the École nationale supérieure de bibliothécaires, was established by decree in 1963 as an Établissement public à caractère administratif. The contemporary Enssib was formed by later decree in 1992, with elevated status as a grand établissement.

It provides education and training for library curators and librarians in the French civil service after a competitive examination. The school is also a member of the University of Lyon and grants a variety of master's degrees, open to those not in the civil service.

The school belongs to the Couperin consortium.

See also
 
 Dominique Varry

References

External links 

 Official Enssib site (in French)

Information schools
Library science education
Technical universities and colleges in France
Villeurbanne